The Governor of Makkah Region or Emir of Makkah Region is the head of the Saudi region or province of Makkah or Mecca and rule it on behalf of the King of Saudi Arabia since its formation on 1926. The Governor or Emir is the high-ranking official of the region and had all powers to shape the region.

The governor is appointed by the King of Saudi Arabia to handle the provincial matters. The governor is also known as Emir as all the Saudi Regions or Provinces are called Emirates. The current Governor of Makkah is Khalid bin Faisal and the Deputy Governor is Bandar bin Sultan. This is his second term in this post since 29 January 2015.

The longest serving governor was Faisal Al Saud and shortest was Khalid bin Mansoor.

Emirate of Makkah Province 
The Makkah Region was established in 1926 during the unification of Saudi Arabia. The Ministry of Interior controls most of the provincial affairs along with the Governor and his Deputy Governor or Naib Emir.

Functions of the Governor 

 Representing the authority of the Custodian of the Two Holy Mosques in the province.
 Ensure the Justice to the citizens of the province.
 Works to maintain security in the province.
 Provides the all services to the citizens of the province.
 Work on the development of the province.
 Appoints the important officials of the provincial authority including the Deputy Governor
 Ensure the effectiveness of law and order in the province.

List of governors of Makkah Region 
The position of Governor (Emir) of the Makkah Province has been held by the following individuals since 1925:

Timeline

See also 

 Makkah Region
 Politics of Saudi Arabia
 Regions of Saudi Arabia
 Emirate
 Emir
 Absolute monarchy

References

External links 
 Emirate of the Makkah Province 

Mecca Province